Hinduism is a minority religion in Korea. There are 24,414 Indians in South Korea, most of whom are Hindus. Through Buddhism, it has also had an indirect impact on certain aspects of traditional Korean thought.  The Four Heavenly Kings that can be seen in Korean Buddhist temples originated from the Lokapālas. Also Skanda,Daeyejeok Geumgang, Sakra,Yama and Brahma were worshipped.

North Korea
There are 586 Indians (most of them are embassy workers) in North Korea, most of whom are Hindus.

South Korea

There are many Hindu temples in the Seoul region, like the Sri Radha Shyamasundar Mandir and the Sri Sri Radha Krishna temple, located on Seoul's outskirts, approximately 2 hours from the city centre. South Korea is home to a small number of expats, including students and engineers, from countries such as India and Nepal many of whom are Hindu. Yoga has also gained increasing popularity in recent years.

Sri Radha Shyamasundar Mandir is open daily, at specific times in the morning and evening. The temple offers various services to the mostly expat Hindu community, including children's classes, religious courses, festivals and ceremonies, such as weddings, as well as groceries for vegetarians.

Though South Korea is mostly secular and Christian, the range of religious beliefs displayed is quite broad. While Korean Shamanism shares some similarities with Hinduism, most religious people adhere to either Buddhism or Christianity, and there remains a strong Confucian presence.

The Rath Yatra was celebrated for the first time on the banks of the famous Han River in Seoul, the capital of South Korea, organized by the Seoul Sanatan Temple.

List of Hindu temples in South Korea

 Sri Radha Shyamasundar Mandir, in Central Seoul
 Sri Sri Radha Krishna temple of ISKCON movement, in Uijeongbu 20 km away on outskirt of Seoul
 Sri Lakshmi Narayanan Temple, in Metropolitan Seoul
 Himalayan Meditation and Yoga Sadhana Mandir, in Seocho in Seoul

See also
 Hindu calendar
 Hinduism by country
 List of Hindu empires and dynasties
 Buddhism in Korea
 Hinduism in China
 Hinduism in Japan
 Indians in Korea
 Koreans in India
 Memorial of Heo Hwang-ok, Ayodhya

Notes

References

External links
Sri Radha Shyamasundar Mandir
Hindu Swayamsevak Sangh Korea

 
Korea